Microphysogobio is a genus of freshwater fish in the family Cyprinidae native to East Asia.

Species
There are currently 28 recognized species in this genus:

 Microphysogobio alticorpus Bănărescu & Nalbant, 1968
 Microphysogobio amurensis (Taranetz, 1937) (Amur longnose gudgeon)
 Microphysogobio anudarini Holčík & Pivnička, 1969
 Microphysogobio brevirostris (Günther, 1868)
 Microphysogobio chinssuensis (Nichols, 1926)
 Microphysogobio elongatus (Yao & Yang, 1977)
 Microphysogobio fukiensis (Nichols, 1926)
 Microphysogobio hsinglungshanensis T. Mori, 1934
 Microphysogobio jeoni I. S. Kim & H. Yang, 1999
 Microphysogobio kachekensis (Ōshima, 1926)
 Microphysogobio kiatingensis (H. W. Wu, 1930)
 Microphysogobio koreensis T. Mori, 1935
 Microphysogobio labeoides (Nichols & C. H. Pope, 1927)
 Microphysogobio liaohensis (K. J. Qin, 1987)
 Microphysogobio linghensis Y. H. Xie, 1986
 Microphysogobio longidorsalis T. Mori, 1935
 Microphysogobio microstomus P. Q. Yue, 1995
 Microphysogobio nudiventris Z. G. Jiang, E. H. Gao & E. Zhang, 2012
 Microphysogobio pseudoelongatus Y. H. Zhao & C. G. Zhang, 2001
 Microphysogobio rapidus B. S. Chae & H. J. Yang, 1999
 Microphysogobio tafangensis (K. F. Wang, 1935)
 Microphysogobio tungtingensis (Nichols, 1926) (Long-nosed gudgeon) 
 Microphysogobio vietnamica Đ. Y. Mai, 1978
 Microphysogobio wulonghensis Y. C. Xing, Y. H. Zhao, W. Q. Tang & C. G. Zhang, 2011
 Microphysogobio xianyouensis S. P. Huang, I. S. Chen & K. T. Shao, 2016
 Microphysogobio yaluensis (T. Mori, 1928)
 Microphysogobio yunnanensis (Yao & Yang, 1977)
 Microphysogobio zhangi Huang et al., 2017

References

 
Fish of Asia
Freshwater fish genera
Taxa named by Tamezo Mori
Ray-finned fish genera